Ngozi Sonia Okobi-Okeoghene (born 14 December 1993) is a Nigerian professional footballer who plays as a forward for Swedish club Eskilstuna United DFF and the Nigeria women's national team.

International career
Ngozi played the 2008 FIFA U-17 Women's World Cup, 2010 FIFA U-17 Women's World Cup and 2012 FIFA U-20 Women's World Cup with the Falconets (nickname of the younger Nigeria women's national football teams).

At senior level (nicknamed Super Falcons) she was part of the squads at the African Women's Championship tournaments of 2010, 2012 and 2014, winning two of them (2010 and 2014). She also played for Nigeria at the 2015 FIFA Women's World Cup.

Ngozi Okobi has played for the Nigerian team albeit the under 17 squad since 2008 and got her first senior call up immediately after the U-17 tournament in 2010. The forward registered her first international goal against Zambia where she aided Nigeria trounce the hosts 6–0 at the 2014 African Women's Championship.

Club career
On 23 June 2015, Washington Spirit announced a deal (in principle) for the attacker from her home-town club, Delta Queens of the Nigerian Women's Championship for an undisclosed fee thereby making her the third Nigerian to move to the National Women's Soccer League club in 2015 behind attacker Francisca Ordega and the second in the World Cup behind defender, Josephine Chukwunonye.

On 6 January 2016, the Washington Spirit waived Okobi.

Style of play
She is known for her resilience and prefers playing the coveted "10" role; just behind the striker though she can play in a number of positions including attacking midfielder, winger and right wing-back.

Honours

International
 Nigeria
 African Women's Championship (4):  2010, 2014, 2016, 2018

Individual
 IFFHS CAF Woman Team of the Decade 2011–2020

References

External links
 
 

1993 births
Living people
Nigeria women's international footballers
Women's association football forwards
2015 FIFA Women's World Cup players
Nigerian women's footballers
Washington Spirit players
National Women's Soccer League players
2019 FIFA Women's World Cup players
Eskilstuna United DFF players
Damallsvenskan players
Nigerian expatriate women's footballers
Nigerian expatriate sportspeople in the United States
Expatriate women's soccer players in the United States
Nigerian expatriate sportspeople in Sweden
Expatriate women's footballers in Sweden
Delta Queens F.C. players